Buckover Road Cutting is a 1.7 hectare geological Site of Special Scientific Interest near the town of Thornbury, South Gloucestershire, notified in 1967.

The site shows an unconformity between Silurian rocks and quartz conglomerate of the Devonian period.

References

External links 
 English Nature citation sheet for the site  (accessed 9 July 2006)

Sites of Special Scientific Interest in Avon
Sites of Special Scientific Interest notified in 1967
Road cuttings in the United Kingdom
Transport in Gloucestershire
Geology of Gloucestershire
Thornbury, Gloucestershire